Kaun Hai Jo Sapno Mein Aaya  (transl. Who Is The One Who Comes In My Dreams) is a 2004 Indian Romantic movie directed by Rajesh Bhatt and produced by Vibha Ragani. It stars Rakesh Bapat and Richa Pallod.

Plot
Kuldeep Khanna, who lives in London, agrees to look after Mahek, the niece of his friend Dr. Verma, while she comes to London for a month-long stay. She begins to teach members of the household about Indian traditions and helps reform the household. Meanwhile, Khanna's son Sunny falls in love with her and proposes that they get married. She turns his request down, saying that she is seeing someone else. Soon Mahek becomes unpopular with the Khannas. Finally Sunny discovers the truth behind her rejection: as she suffers from an incurable disease, and does not want to create trouble for Sunny and his family.

Cast
 Rakesh Bapat as Sunny K. Khanna
 Richa Pallod as Mahek
 Anupam Kher as Dr. Verma
 Kader Khan as Kuldeep Khanna
Sheela Sharma as Bantho Patel 
Navneet Nishan as Mrs. Kuldeep Khanna 
Vineeta Malik as Mrs. Khanna 
Usha Bachani as Pramila Khanna 
Reshmee Doolub as Sweety Khanna 
Rana Jung Bahadur as Kartar Singh 
 Saeed Jaffrey
 Zohra Segal

Music
The music were composed by Nikhil-Vinay. Sameer write the lyrics.

Reception
Taran Adarsh of  IndiaFM gave the film 1 out of 5, writing ″Rakesh Bapat plays the lover-boy part with ease. He seems to be improving with every film. Richa Pallod is a revelation and carries the film on her shoulders. Even she seems to have improved considerably vis-?is her previous works. Amongst character actors, Kader Khan is alright. Anupam Kher is wasted. Usha Bachani gets no scope. Ditto for Navneet Nishan. Vinita Malik hams throughout. The remaining cast [family members] is a bunch of non-actors. On the whole, KAUN HAI JO SAPNO MEIN AAYA is a dull fare.

References

External links

2000s Hindi-language films
Films scored by Nikhil-Vinay